The 1888 United States presidential election in Maine took place on November 6, 1888, as part of the 1888 United States presidential election. Voters chose six representatives, or electors to the Electoral College, who voted for president and vice president.

Maine voted for the Republican nominee, Benjamin Harrison, over the Democratic nominee, incumbent President Grover Cleveland. Harrison won the state by a margin of 18.14%.

With 57.49% of the popular vote, Maine would prove to be Harrison's third strongest victory in terms of percentage in the popular vote after Vermont and Nevada.

Results

Results by county

See also
 United States presidential elections in Maine

Notes

References

Maine
1888
1888 Maine elections